Thomas Farrington (died 1758) of Chislehurst, Kent, was a British politician who sat in the House of Commons between 1727 and 1754.

Farrington was the only son of Lt.-Gen. Thomas Farrington MP of Chislehurst and his wife Theodosia Betenson, daughter of Richard Betenson. He was connected with the Selwyn family since his mother's sister had married Major-General William Selwyn, MP whose eldest son, his cousin John Selwyn, married Farrington's sister Mary. He succeeded his father in 1712.
  
Farrington was returned as Member of Parliament for Whitchurch at a by-election on 2 February 1727. At the 1727 general election, he succeeded his cousin Charles Selwyn as MP for Mitchell. He was appointed auditor of the land revenues for Wales in 1733 and although he was re-elected at the required by-election in  1733, he was defeated at the 1734 general election. He next stood for parliament in  1747  when returned for Ludgershall on the interest of his cousin John Selwyn. He voted for the Administration in all recorded occasions. He did not stand in 1754.

Farrington died unmarried  on 29 January 1758.

References

Year of birth missing
1758 deaths
Members of the Parliament of Great Britain for English constituencies
British MPs 1722–1727
British MPs 1727–1734
British MPs 1747–1754